Karl-Heinz Granitza (born 1 November 1951) is a German former professional footballer who played as a forward.  In the United States, he is a member of the National Soccer Hall of Fame.

Granitza was born in Lünen, North Rhine-Westphalia. He played in Germany for VfB Lünen, Eintracht Dortmund, Lüner SV, DJK Gütersloh, SV Röchling Völklingen and Hertha BSC. In 1978 and again for the 1979 season, he transferred to the Chicago Sting of the NASL, leading the team to two league championships.  He also excelled at the indoor game.  Granitza was known for his powerful and accurate left foot. He was also very effective with direct free kicks, having the ability to strike the ball with top spin over the wall of defenders, and into the upper corners of the goal. He would finish as the NASL's second all-time leading scorer.

In the 1990s Granitza owned "State Street", an American-style sports bar in Berlin.

In 2003, Granitza was inducted into the National Soccer Hall of Fame.  His #12 shirt has been retired by the Chicago Storm.

References

External links
 
 NASL/MISL stats
 

1951 births
Living people
People from Lünen
Sportspeople from Arnsberg (region)
West German footballers
Association football forwards
Chicago Sting (MISL) players
Chicago Sting (NASL) players
Bundesliga players
2. Bundesliga players
German footballers
Hertha BSC players
FC Gütersloh 2000 players
Major Indoor Soccer League (1978–1992) players
North American Soccer League (1968–1984) indoor players
National Soccer Hall of Fame members
North American Soccer League (1968–1984) players
West German expatriate footballers
West German expatriate sportspeople in the United States
Expatriate soccer players in the United States
Footballers from North Rhine-Westphalia